Iron(II) nitrate is the nitrate salt of iron(II).  It is commonly encountered as the green hexahydrate, Fe(NO3)2·6H2O, which is a metal aquo complex, however it is not commercially available unlike iron(III)  nitrate due to its instability to air. The salt is soluble in water serves as a ready source of ferrous ions.

Structure
No structure of any salt Fe(NO3)2·xH2O has been determined by X-ray crystallography.  Nonetheless, the nature of the aquo complex [Fe(H2O)6]2+ is well known and relatively insensitive to the anion.  The Fe-O distances are longer for [Fe(H2O)6]2+ (2.13 Å) than for the ferric analogue [Fe(H2O)6]3+ (1.99 Å).  Both [Fe(H2O)6]n+ complexes are high spin, which results in pale colors, paramagnetism, and weak Fe-O bonds.

Production
Iron(II) nitrate can be produced in multiple ways such as the reaction of iron metal with cold dilute nitric acid:
3Fe + 8HNO3  +  12H2O  →  3Fe(NO3)2(H2O)6 + 2NO
If this reaction is conducted below -10 °C, nonahydrate is produced. It readily releases water to give the hexahydrate.

The above reaction can also co-produce ferric nitrate. Reacting iron(II) sulfate and lead nitrate under dilute ethanol and then evaporating the solution leads to the formation of the green crystals of the hexahydrate. A solution of iron(II) nitrate is produced by the ion-exchange reaction of iron(II) sulfate and barium nitrate, producing a concentration of up to 1.5 M due to the limited solubility of barium nitrate.

The solution of the iron(II) nitrate-hydrazine complex is produced by the reaction of hydrazine nitrate and ferric nitrate at 40 °C with copper(II) nitrate as a catalyst:
4 Fe(NO3)3 + N2H5NO3 → 4 Fe(NO3)2 + N2 + 4HNO3
If the compound is used in situ, the compound is produced by the reaction of iron(II) chloride and calcium nitrate:
FeCl2 + Ca(NO3)2 → Fe(NO3)2 + CaCl2

Reactions
The hexahydrate melts at 60 °C and then decomposes at 61 °C into iron(III) oxide rather than iron(II) oxide. The solution of iron(II) nitrate is much more stable, decomposing at 107 °C to iron(III), with the presence of nitric acid lowering the decomposition temperature. Concentrated nitric acid oxidizes iron(II) nitrate into iron(III) nitrate:
3Fe(NO3)2 + 4HNO3 → 3Fe(NO3)3 + NO + 2H2O

Uses
Iron(II) nitrate has no uses, however, there is a potential use for dye removal.

References

Iron(II) compounds
Nitrates
Orthorhombic crystals